Orghoch is a village in Chitral District, Khyber Pakhtunkhwa Province of Pakistan.

Educational institutions
GOVERNMENT MIDDLE SCHOOL ORGHOCH
GGPS ORGHOCH, CHITRAL. School Code. 12473
GMPS ORGHOCH
Orghoch Public School Orghoch Chitral
F.G Girls Secondary School

See also
Singoor
Seenlasht
Gahirat

References

Chitral District
Populated places in Chitral District